The EMI Years: The Complete Collection is the eighth compilation album and second box set album by Greek singer Despina Vandi, released in 2007 by her previous record label Minos EMI in Greece and Cyprus.

Track listing

Release history

Credits and personnel

Personnel
P. Apostolidis - music
M. Doulianakis -lyrics
Panos Falaras - lyrics
Natalia Germanou - lyrics
M. Giaprakas - music
Pantelis Kanarakis - lyrics
Thanasis Kargidis - music
Vasilis Karras - music, lyrics
L. Komninos - lyrics
Tony Kontaxakis - music, lyrics
Giorgos Lembesis - vocals
Lambis Livieratos - lyrics
Christoforos Mpalampanidis - lyrics
Christos Nikolopoulos - music
Giannis Parios - vocals, music, lyrics
Giorgos Pavrianos - lyrics
Phoebus - music, lyrics
Ercan Saatçi - music, lyrics
Despina Vandi - vocals
Harry Varthakouris - music, lyrics

Production
Thodoris Hrisanthopoulos - audio digital remastering
Haris Tsakmatsian - repertoire selection

Design
Evi Efthimiou - artwork
Tasos Vrettos - photo

Credits adapted from the album's liner notes.

References

External links
 Official site

2007 compilation albums
Albums produced by Phoebus (songwriter)
Despina Vandi compilation albums
Greek-language albums
Minos EMI compilation albums